HMS Gardiner (K478) was a British Captain-class frigate of the Royal Navy in commission during World War II. Originally constructed as the United States Navy Evarts-class destroyer escort USS O'Toole (DE-274), she served in the Royal Navy from 1943 to 1946.

Construction and transfer
The ship was laid down as the U.S. Navy destroyer escort USS O'Toole (DE-274), the first ship of the name, by the Boston Navy Yard in Boston, Massachusetts, on 20 May 1943 and launched on 8 July 1943. O'Toole was transferred to the United Kingdom under Lend-Lease upon completion on 28 September 1943.

Service history

Commissioned into service in the Royal Navy as HMS Gardiner (K478) on 28 September 1943 simultaneously with her transfer, the ship served on patrol and escort duty for the remainder of World War II.

The Royal Navy decommissioned Gardiner in 1945 after the end of the war and returned her to the U.S. Navy at the Boston Naval Shipyard on 12 February 1946.

Disposal
The United States sold Gardiner to the Atlas Steel and Supply Company on 10 December 1946 for scrapping. In 1947, she was resold to the Kulky Steel and Equipment Company of Alliance, Ohio, and finally was scrapped in June 1947.

References
 (Gardiner)
 (O'Toole)
Navsource Online: Destroyer Escort Photo Archive OToole (DE-274) HMS Gardiner (K-478)
uboat.net HMS Gardiner (K 478)

External links
 Photo gallery of HMS Gardiner (K478)

 

Captain-class frigates
Evarts-class destroyer escorts
World War II frigates of the United Kingdom
World War II frigates and destroyer escorts of the United States
Ships built in Boston
1943 ships